Home is the eighth studio album by Blue October. The album was recorded between August and November 2015 at Orb Studios in Austin, Texas and Justin Furstenfeld's home studio Crazy Making Studio. Long-time collaborator, Tim Palmer, co-produced and mixed the album. 

After its first week of sales, Home charted at number 10 on the Building Album Sales chart with sales of 22,194 units. On the Billboard charts, Home debuted at number 1 on the Rock Albums Chart, number 1 on the Alternative Albums Chart, number 1 on the Independent Albums Chart, and number 19 on the Billboard 200. The first single, the title track "Home" made its radio debut December 16, 2015, and spent over six months on the Adult Top 40, peaking at number 24. The followup single "I Want It" also charted, peaking at number 36.

Justin Furstenfeld wrote the album on a tiny keyboard while driving through the California desert.

The cover image is a painting of a photo of Jeremy and Justin Furstenfeld's parents' first kiss.

Track listing

Personnel
 Justin Furstenfeld – vocals, guitar, producer, programming
 Matt Noveskey – bass
 Jeremy Furstenfeld – drums, percussion
 Ryan Delahoussaye - violin, keyboard
 C.B. Hudson - guitar
 Tim Palmer - producer, and mixing
 Mark Needham - co-producer, mixing
 Eric Holtz - engineer, programming
 Steve Schiltz of Longwave- guitar on tracks 1, 2, 3, 4, 6, and 9
 Matt Chamberlain - drums on track 5
 Robert Sewell - assistant engineer
 Brad Bond - package design

Charts

References

2016 albums
Blue October albums
Albums produced by Tim Palmer